Livorno is a resort in Suriname, located in the Paramaribo District.  Its population at the 2012 census was 8,209.

The resort consists of the neighbourhoods Livorno and Bethesda. Livorno is a former sugar plantation founded in 1819 by F. Cassali from Livorno, Italy. Bethesda was the location of a leper colony which had been at that location between 1933, and 1962. Livorno is close to the harbour, and home to small industry.

References

Resorts of Suriname
Populated places in Paramaribo District